The State Anthem of the Moldavian SSR was the regional anthem of the Moldavian Soviet Socialist Republic, a constituent republic of the Soviet Union.

Originally, the anthem began with the words, "Moldova cu doine străbune pe plaiuri" and was composed by Ștefan Neaga, with lyrics by the poets Emilian Bukov and Bogdan Istru (Ivan Bodarev) in 1945.

Ivan Bodiul, the First Secretary of the Communist Party of Moldova, authorized composer Eduard Lazarev to modify the anthem in a "Musical Renovation". (Second Edition of the Anthem).

The lyrics were rewritten, removing all references to Joseph Stalin. The music was also altered, removing the original three-stanza structure in favor of a single-stanza three-part structure.

The beginning words of the anthem were changed to "Moldova Sovietică".

History
In 1945 Ștefan Neaga wrote the melody for the Anthem of the Moldova SSR, and the poets Emil Bukov and Bogdan Istru created the lyrics. The composer and the writers then won the first prize of a national musical contest in the Soviet Union, where composers from Moldova and other Soviet republics presented their works.

E. Bukov remarked on how demanding and self-critic Ștefan Neaga was. He composed dozens of variants for the anthem, each time being dissatisfied. Neaga said that the anthem had to be composed so when a person hears it, he would stand up filled by a deep patriotic sentiment.

The anthem they created was highly appreciated by musicians, becoming the main song of the country for over 45 years. Through this musical work, Neaga became the eternal pride and joy of the Moldavian people. Moldova Socialistă remarked on the anthem, "Moldavian SSR's anthem is one of the best creations of this genre. Adopted in 1945, it entered for three and half decades in our republic's symbolism".

Moldovan politician and historian Valeriu Passat [ro] stated in his exhibition, "13 ani de Stalinism. RSS Moldovenească în anii 1940–1953" (13 Years of Stalinism, Moldavian SSR in years 1940–1953) that Iosif Mordoveț [ro] forced the authors to write the anthem.

In the only instrumental recording of the Moldavian SSR national anthem, made by the Brass Band of the USSR Ministry of Defence in 1968, the original version made by Neaga in 1945 can be heard. It is a typical Soviet republic anthem with three stanzas and three choruses.

According to Vladimir Poțeluev, this anthem was created by an order made by the Supreme Soviet in Moscow, after the annexation of the Moldavian ASSR and Bessarabia (the west and east territory of the Dniester River) to the Soviet Union. The Supreme Soviet also said that the top brass (Stalin and others) set multiple rules for the writers of the lyrics:
 Mention to the Communist Party of the Soviet Union.
 Mention to the "Yugo Liberation" from capitalism.
 Mention to the development of infrastructure under the Soviets.
 Mention to the unity of Moldavian people with the rest of the union (something typical in the anthems of the Soviet republics).
 Mention to the total expulsion of fascists on Moldavian Territory (Soviet victory over Hitler).

Rejected lyrics:

"It was very melodic and it had some ties with folk music," the musicologist Leonid Răilean said of the anthem. When Stalin died in 1953, during De-Stalinization, the state anthems were muted by Nikita Khrushchev and the Moldovian SSR anthem was simply a long melody during this period, without any official lyrics. In 1977, the Soviet Union adopted a new constitution and replaced the lyrics of the national anthem, and all of its constituent republics followed the same path. Ivan Bodiul, who took over in 1961, was dissatisfied of the long and lyric-less anthem, and decided to make it shorter and simpler, keeping the original idea of the anthem. 
And, as its author was no longer alive, Ivan Bodiul authorized Eduard Lazarev "to renovate" the anthem. The new composition maintained the music of the verses, added an introduction, an intermezzo, and in the end a variation of the old Chorus. This renovation deformed and damaged the music structure and thus, its sonority. One way or another, in the early 90s, this anthem was "thrown to the garbage dump of history, as well as other signs of the past times".

Ștefan Neaga said that he wanted to represent with his work "the creativity and love of Great Stalin, the certainty of the victory of communism, and his desire to give all his forces in this unique case".

"I wanted to play in this gratifying music event, to create the symbol of these historic victories, in which the Moldovan people regained their freedom."

Lyrics

Orthography

The Cyrillic script was used officially for the Romanian language (also called Moldovan in Transnistria and by less developed rural regions of Moldova) during Soviet times. However, after 1989, the Romanian language in modern-day Moldova now officially uses the Latin script; only the breakaway state of Transnistria (internationally recognized as a part of Moldova) still officially uses the Cyrillic alphabet.

Original version (1945–1953)

Post-Stalinist version (1980–1991)

After Stalin's death in 1953, like other SSR anthems, any mentions of the former leader have been removed; however, a new version of the anthem wasn't adopted until 1980. The anthem was rewritten from the typical three verses with choruses—like other SSR anthems—to a three-part single verse without choruses, which was used until the collapse of the Soviet Union in 1991.

The music was composed by Ștefan Neaga and was arranged by Eduard Lazarev, and the lyrics were written by Emilian Bucov and Bogdan Istru.

See also
 Limba noastră
 Anthem of Transnistria

Notes

References

Moldavian SSR
Moldovan music
National symbols of Moldova
Moldavian Soviet Socialist Republic